The Best of Earth, Wind & Fire, Vol. 1 is the first greatest hits album by the American band Earth, Wind & Fire issued in 1978 by Columbia Records. The album rose to No. 3 & 6 on the Billboard Top Soul Albums and Billboard 200 charts respectively.  The album has been certified Quintuple Platinum in the US by the RIAA, as well as Platinum in the UK and Canada, by the BPI and Music Canada, respectively.

Singles 
The album produced three new songs and two singles. The LP's first single, "Got to Get You into My Life", preceded the album by a few months and was first included on the 1978 soundtrack Sgt. Pepper's Lonely Hearts Club Band from the feature film with the same title. The single reached Nos. 1 & 9 on the Billboard Hot Soul Songs and Hot 100 charts respectively. Got to Get You into My Life was Grammy nominated in the category of Best Pop Vocal Performance by a Duo, Group or Chorus. The song went on to win a Grammy for Best Instrumental Arrangement Accompanying Vocalist(s).
 
The second single, "September" rose to Nos. 1 and 8 on the Billboard Hot Soul Songs and Hot 100 respectively. "September" also got to No. 3 on the UK Pop Singles chart.

Critical reception 

The Los Angeles Times called the album "An excellent package with no extraneous or weak tracks". Steve Huey of AllMusic said "But even if it's an incomplete hits collection, The Best of Earth, Wind & Fire, Vol. 1 still ranks as a strong encapsulation of EWF the funk innovators. The singles gathered here constitute some of the richest, most sophisticated music the funk movement ever produced; when the absolute cream of the group's catalog is heard in such a concentrated fashion, the effect is dazzling." Huey added "1998's Greatest Hits now stands as the definitive single-disc EWF overview, but for the budget-minded and the disco-phobic, this still makes for an excellent listen." Robert Christgau of The Village Voice found "Despite some annoying omissions, notably "Serpentine Fire," this sums them up--ten exquisitely crafted pop tunes in which all the passion and resonance of black music tradition are blended into a concoction slicker and more sumptuous than any white counterpart since Glenn Miller". The New York Daily News also claimed "Since its beginning, Earth Wind and Fire have been one of the slickest soul aggregations around, and this record is a well-paced showcase. Sometimes it's hard to believe that the combination of influences, ranging from Sly Stone and Stevie Wonder to the decidedly Chicagoesque horn arrangements, doesn't overcome the group, but its high spirits continually take it over the top." Crispin Cioe of High Fidelity wrote "For pop/r&b mavens, this one's a must."

Track listing

Personnel

Performance 
 Philip Bailey – vocals, percussion
 Rhamlee Michael Davis – trumpet, flugelhorn
 Larry Dunn – keyboards
 Johnny Graham – guitar, percussion
 Michael Harris – trumpet, flugelhorn
 Alan Hewitt – keyboards
 Ralph Johnson – drums, percussion
 Al McKay – guitar, percussion
 Don Myrick – saxophone
 Louis Satterfield – trombone
 Dick Smith – guitar
 Fred White – drums
 Maurice White – vocals, drums, percussion
 Verdine White – bass
 Andrew Woolfolk – saxophone, flute

Production 
 Philip Bailey – liner notes
 George Calle – producer, audio engineer, audio mixing
 Mauro DeSantis – producer, engineer, mixing
 Larry Dunn – production assistant
 Earth, Wind & Fire – arranger
 Howard Fritzson – art direction
 David Gahr – Photography
 Jay Graydon – songwriter
 Alan Hewitt – programming, producer, engineer, mixing
 Paul Klingberg – producer, engineer, mixing
 Art Macnow – director
 Cameron Marcarelli – assistant engineer
 Al McKay – producer
 Shusei Nagaoka – artwork
 Steve Newman – design
 Joseph M. Palmaccio – mastering
 Leo Sacks – producer, liner notes, reissue producer
 Richard Salvato – director
 Jim Shea – photography
 Charles Stepney – arranger, producer
 Tom Tom 84 – horn arrangements, string arrangements
 Chris Walter – photography
 Maurice White – arranger, producer, engineer, liner notes, sixing
 Verdine White – liner notes, production assistant
 Mark Wilder – audio mastering
 Joseph Wissert – producer

Charts

Weekly charts

Year-end charts

Certifications

References 

Albums produced by Maurice White
Albums produced by Charles Stepney
1978 greatest hits albums
Earth, Wind & Fire compilation albums
Albums with cover art by Shusei Nagaoka
Columbia Records albums
Columbia Records compilation albums
ARC Records albums
Legacy Recordings compilation albums